Marion Technical Institute (MTI) is Marion County's vocational school that offers 9 on-campus academies and coenrollment opportunities while students still earn their high school diploma. The students get hands on experience in their academy classes and are given the opportunity to earn impressive national certifications. The school works closely with local businesses and industry leaders to provide students with internship opportunities. Students from Marion County High Schools that are at least 16 years old may apply to attend the school with an essay and have their school record screened.

Academies 
The 9 Academies the school offers are:
 Information Technology
 Building Sciences
 Robotics Automation & Design
 Culinary Arts
 Automotive Technology
 Business & Finance
 Law and Government
 Career Academy
 Global Logistics

First year 
In 2006, MTI was recognized by the United States Department of Labor Employment, at the third annual Recognition of Excellence honors in Anaheim, receiving Honorable Mention for "successfully demonstrating sustained partnerships among employment, educators, and economic development leaders — ETA’s 'Power of e3'".  The achievement statistics at the end of its first year were:
 an 88% graduation rate (the state average being 72%)
 66% graduates placed in training-related jobs
 273 industry specific certifications awarded to students
 31% students placed in paid, training-related internships
 53% students placed in unpaid, training-related internships (Dual enrollment only)
 17% placed in training-related, part-time jobs

References

External links 
MTI Facebook Page
MTI Home Page
Marion County Public Schools Website

Further reading 

Buildings and structures in Ocala, Florida
High schools in Marion County, Florida
Public high schools in Florida
2005 establishments in Florida
Educational institutions established in 2005